The 2015 FINA Diving World Series is the seventh edition of  FINA Diving World Series. This World Series was made up by six legs hosted in different cities: 1st leg Beijing, China; 2nd leg Dubai, United Arab Emirates; 3rd leg Kazan, Russia; 4th leg London, Great Britain; 5th leg Windsor, Canada; and 6th leg Mérida, Mexico.

Overall medal tally

Beijing leg 
The results from the Beijing leg are as follows.

Medal table

Medal summary

Men

Women

Mixed

Dubai leg 
The results of the Dubai leg are as follows.

Medal table

Medal summary

Men

Women

Mixed

Kazan leg 
The results of the Kazan leg are as follows.

Medal table

Medal summary

Men

Women

Mixed

London leg 
The results of the London leg are as follows.

Medal table

Medal summary

Men

Women

Mixed

Windsor leg 
The results of the Windsor leg are as follows.

Medal table

Medal summary

Men

Women

Mixed

Mérida leg
The results of the Mérida leg are as follows.

Medal table

Medal summary

Men

Women

Mixed

References 

2015 in diving
FINA Diving World Series